Baerus or Bairos was a town of ancient Macedonia, placed by Ptolemy in the district of Mygdonia. The name also comes down to us in the form Boerus.

Its site is unlocated.

References

Populated places in ancient Macedonia
Former populated places in Greece
Lost ancient cities and towns
Geography of ancient Mygdonia